The Institute of Hydrobiology, Chinese Academy of Sciences is a research institute located in Wuhan, Hubei, China. It was founded in 1950 and specializes in freshwater organisms. It is involved in the study of the finless porpoise and the now extinct baiji dolphin. China Zebrafish Resource Center is housed in the institute campus.

IHB is one of the oldest institutes for aquatic sciences in China, has made contributions to the advancement of aquatic sciences in China and globally.

The Gallery

References

External links
 

Research institutes of the Chinese Academy of Sciences
Education in Wuhan
1950 establishments in China
Aquaria in China